A voltage multiplier is an electrical circuit that converts AC electrical power from a lower voltage to a higher DC voltage, typically using a network of capacitors and diodes.

Voltage multipliers can be used to generate a few volts for electronic appliances, to millions of volts for purposes such as high-energy physics experiments and lightning safety testing. The most common type of voltage multiplier is the half-wave series multiplier, also called the Villard cascade (but actually invented by Heinrich Greinacher).

Operation
Assuming that the peak voltage of the AC source is +Us, and that the C values are sufficiently high to allow, when charged, that a current flows with no significant change in voltage, then the (simplified) working of the cascade is as follows:

 negative peak (−Us): The C1 capacitor is charged through diode D1 to Us V (potential difference between left and right plate of the capacitor is Us)
 positive peak (+Us): the potential of C1 adds with that of the source, thus charging C2 to 2Us through D2
 negative peak: potential of C1 has dropped to 0 V thus allowing C3 to be charged through D3 to 2Us.
 positive peak: potential of C2 rises to 2Us (analogously to step 2), also charging C4 to 2Us. The output voltage (the sum of voltages under C2 and C4) rises until 4Us is reached.

In reality more cycles are required for C4 to reach the full voltage. Each additional stage of two diodes and two capacitors increases the output voltage by twice the peak AC supply voltage.

Voltage doubler and tripler

A voltage doubler uses two stages to approximately double the DC voltage that would have been obtained from a single-stage rectifier. An example of a voltage doubler is found in the input stage of switch mode power supplies containing a SPDT switch to select either 120 V or 240 V supply. In the 120 V position the input is typically configured as a full-wave voltage doubler by opening one AC connection point of a bridge rectifier, and connecting the input to the junction of two series-connected filter capacitors. For 240 V operation, the switch configures the system as a full-wave bridge, re-connecting the capacitor center-tap wire to the open AC terminal of a bridge rectifier system. This allows 120 or 240 V operation with the addition of a simple SPDT switch.

A voltage tripler is a three-stage voltage multiplier. A tripler is a popular type of voltage multiplier. The output voltage of a tripler is in practice below three times the peak input voltage due to their high impedance, caused in part by the fact that as each capacitor in the chain supplies power to the next, it partially discharges, losing voltage doing so.

Triplers were commonly used in color television receivers to provide the high voltage for the cathode ray tube (CRT, picture tube). 

Triplers are still used in high voltage supplies such as copiers, laser printers, bug zappers and electroshock weapons.

Breakdown voltage 
While the multiplier can be used to produce thousands of volts of output, the individual components do not need to be rated to withstand the entire voltage range. Each component only needs to be concerned with the relative voltage differences directly across its own terminals and of the components immediately adjacent to it.

Typically a voltage multiplier will be physically arranged like a ladder, so that the progressively increasing voltage potential is not given the opportunity to arc across to the much lower potential sections of the circuit.

Note that some safety margin is needed across the relative range of voltage differences in the multiplier, so that the ladder can survive the shorted failure of at least one diode or capacitor component. Otherwise a single-point shorting failure could successively over-voltage and destroy each next component in the multiplier, potentially destroying the entire multiplier chain.

Other circuit topologies 

Stacking 

An even number of diode-capacitor cells is used in any column so that the cascade ends on a smoothing cell.  If it were odd and ended on a clamping cell the ripple voltage would be very large.  Larger capacitors in the connecting column also reduce ripple but at the expense of charging time and increased diode current.

Dickson charge pump

The Dickson charge pump, or Dickson multiplier, is a modification of the Greinacher/Cockcroft–Walton multiplier.  Unlike that circuit, however, the Dickson multiplier takes a DC supply as its input so is a form of DC-to-DC converter.  Also, unlike Greinacher/Cockcroft–Walton which is used on high-voltage applications, the Dickson multiplier is intended for low-voltage purposes.  In addition to the DC input, the circuit requires a feed of two clock pulse trains with an amplitude swinging between the DC supply rails.  These pulse trains are in antiphase.

To describe the ideal operation of the circuit, number the diodes D1, D2 etc. from left to right and the capacitors C1, C2 etc.  When the clock  is low, D1 will charge C1 to Vin.  When  goes high the top plate of C1 is pushed up to 2Vin.  D1 is then turned off and D2 turned on and C2 begins to charge to 2Vin.  On the next clock cycle  again goes low and now  goes high pushing the top plate of C2 to 3Vin.  D2 switches off and D3 switches on, charging C3 to 3Vin and so on with charge passing up the chain, hence the name charge pump.  The final diode-capacitor cell in the cascade is connected to ground rather than a clock phase and hence is not a multiplier; it is a peak detector which merely provides smoothing.

There are a number of factors which reduce the output from the ideal case of nVin.  One of these is the threshold voltage, VT of the switching device, that is, the voltage required to turn it on.  The output will be reduced by at least nVT due to the volt drops across the switches.  Schottky diodes are commonly used in Dickson multipliers for their low forward voltage drop, amongst other reasons.  Another difficulty is that there are parasitic capacitances to ground at each node.  These parasitic capacitances act as voltage dividers with the circuit's storage capacitors reducing the output voltage still further.  Up to a point, a higher clock frequency is beneficial: the ripple is reduced and the high frequency makes the remaining ripple easier to filter.  Also the size of capacitors needed is reduced since less charge needs to be stored per cycle.  However, losses through stray capacitance increase with increasing clock frequency and a practical limit is around a few hundred kilohertz.

Dickson multipliers are frequently found in integrated circuits (ICs) where they are used to increase a low-voltage battery supply to the voltage needed by the IC.  It is advantageous to the IC designer and manufacturer to be able to use the same technology and the same basic device throughout the IC.  For this reason, in the popular CMOS technology ICs the transistor which forms the basic building block of circuits is the MOSFET.  Consequently, the diodes in the Dickson multiplier are often replaced with MOSFETs wired to behave as diodes.

The diode-wired MOSFET version of the Dickson multiplier does not work very well at very low voltages because of the large drain-source volt drops of the MOSFETs.  Frequently, a more complex circuit is used to overcome this problem.  One solution is to connect in parallel with the switching MOSFET another MOSFET biased into its linear region.  This second MOSFET has a lower drain-source voltage than the switching MOSFET would have on its own (because the switching MOSFET is driven hard on) and consequently the output voltage is increased.  The gate of the linear biased MOSFET is connected to the output of the next stage so that it is turned off while the next stage is charging from the previous stage's capacitor.  That is, the linear-biased transistor is turned off at the same time as the switching transistor.

More complex circuits still can achieve an output much closer to the ideal case.

Many other variations and improvements to the basic Dickson circuit exist.  Some attempt to reduce the switching threshold voltage such as the Mandal-Sarpeshkar multiplier or the Wu multiplier.  Other circuits cancel out the threshold voltage: the Umeda multiplier does it with an externally provided voltage and the Nakamoto multiplier does it with internally generated voltage.  The Bergeret multiplier concentrates on maximising power efficiency.

Modification for RF power

In CMOS integrated circuits clock signals are readily available, or else easily generated.  This is not always the case in RF integrated circuits, but often a source of RF power will be available.  The standard Dickson multiplier circuit can be modified to meet this requirement by simply grounding the normal input and one of the clock inputs.  RF power is injected into the other clock input, which then becomes the circuit input.  The RF signal is effectively the clock as well as the source of power.  However, since the clock is injected only into every other node the circuit only achieves a stage of multiplication for every second diode-capacitor cell.  The other diode-capacitor cells are merely acting as peak detectors and smoothing the ripple without increasing the multiplication.

Cross-coupled switched capacitor

A voltage multiplier may be formed of a cascade of voltage doublers of the cross-coupled switched capacitor type. Dickson multipliers have increasingly poor power conversion efficiency as the input voltage drops because the voltage drop across the diode-wired transistors becomes much more significant compared to the output voltage. Since the transistors in the cross-coupled circuit are not diode-wired the volt-drop problem is not so serious.

This behaviour leads to another advantage over the Dickson multiplier: reduced ripple voltage at double the frequency. The increase in ripple frequency is advantageous because it is easier to remove by filtering. Each stage (in an ideal circuit) raises the output voltage by the peak clock voltage. Assuming that this is the same level as the DC input voltage then an n stage multiplier will (ideally) output nVin. The chief cause of losses in the cross-coupled circuit is parasitic capacitance rather than switching threshold voltage. The losses occur because some of the energy has to go into charging up the parasitic capacitances on each cycle.

Applications 

The high-voltage supplies for cathode-ray tubes (CRTs) in TVs often use voltage multipliers with the final-stage smoothing  capacitor formed by the interior and exterior aquadag coatings on the CRT itself.  CRTs were formerly a common component in television sets.  Voltage multipliers can still be found in modern TVs, photocopiers, and bug zappers.

High voltage multipliers are used in spray painting equipment, most commonly found in automotive manufacturing facilities. A voltage multiplier with an output of about 100kV is used in the nozzle of the paint sprayer to electrically charge the atomized paint particles which then get attracted to the oppositely charged metal surfaces to be painted. This helps reduce the volume of paint used and helps in spreading an even coat of paint.

A common type of voltage multiplier used in high-energy physics is the Cockcroft–Walton generator (which was designed by John Douglas Cockcroft and Ernest Thomas Sinton Walton for a particle accelerator for use in research that won them the Nobel Prize in Physics in 1951).

See also
 Marx generator (a device that uses spark gaps instead of diodes as the switching elements and can deliver higher peak currents than diodes can).
 Boost converter (a DC-to-DC power converter that steps up voltage, frequently using an inductor)

Notes

Bibliography
Campardo, Giovanni; Micheloni, Rino; Novosel, David VLSI-design of Non-volatile Memories, Springer, 2005 .
Lin, Yu-Shiang Low Power Circuits for Miniature Sensor Systems, Publisher	ProQuest, 2008 .
Liu, Mingliang Demystifying Switched Capacitor Circuits, Newnes, 2006 .
McGowan, Kevin, Semiconductors: From Book to Breadboard, Cengage Learning, 2012 .
Peluso, Vincenzo; Steyaert, Michiel; Sansen, Willy M. C. Design of Low-voltage Low-power CMOS Delta-Sigma A/D Converters, Springer, 1999 .
Yuan, Fei CMOS Circuits for Passive Wireless Microsystems, Springer, 2010 .
Zumbahlen, Hank Linear Circuit Design Handbook, Newnes, 2008 .

External links

 Basic multiplier circuits
 Cockcroft Walton multipliers
 Schematic of Kadette brand (International Radio Corp.) model 1019.  A 1937 radio with a vacuum tube (25Z5) voltage multiplier rectifier.

Electrical circuits
Electric power conversion
Rectifiers